Deulgaon, commonly known as "Deulgaon Banda" is a village located in Risod taluka of Washim district, in the state of Maharashtra.

Demographics
As per 2011 census:
Deulgaon Banda has 362 families residing. The village has population of 1640.
Out of the population of 1640, 832 are males while 808 are females.
Literacy rate of the village is 84.99%.
Average sex ratio of the village is 971 females to 1000 males. Average sex ratio of Maharashtra state is 929.

Geography, and transport

References

Villages in Washim district